Cornufer sulcatus is a species of frog in the family Ceratobatrachidae endemic to the Nakanai Mountains on New Britain Island in Papua New Guinea.

Scientists have seen this frog burrowing in the leaf litter.

References

Amphibians described in 2007
sulcatus
Endemic fauna of Papua New Guinea
Frogs of Asia